Nicole Cassandra Schmitz is a Filipino-German beauty titleholder who represented the Philippines in the Miss International 2012 pageant in Okinawa, Japan on 21 October 2012 where she placed in the Top 15. She is also the third representative of the Philippines to the Miss International pageant with German blood after Miss International 2010 - Top 15 Semi-Finalist, Krista Kleiner and the late Melody Gershbach, Miss International 2009 Top 15 Semi-Finalist.

She is under Rodgil Flores who handled and trained Miss International 2005, Precious Lara Quigaman; Miss International 2008 - Top 12 Semi-Finalist Patricia Fernandez; Miss International 2011 - Top 15 Semi-Finalist Dianne Necio; Miss World 2005 - Top 15 Semi-Finalist Carlene Aguilar; Miss World 2004 - Top 5 Finalist Karla Bautista; Miss Earth Air 2009 Sandra Seifert and Miss Earth 2008 Karla Henry.

Biography
She won the title Binibining Pilipinas International through Binibining Pilipinas 2012 pageant where she was also titled as Best in Swimsuit and Best in National Costume from that edition. In the question-and-answer portion, Schmitz, a law student, was asked by one of the judges John Martin Miller, "Which you would rather be, someone who's respected or someone who is loved and why?" Her answer: "I would rather be someone respected because that means you maintain your integrity, dignity and self-respect and that means that in turn you will be loved by whoever matters and everyone around you." At that time, 'Nicole Schmitz' trended on Twitter both Worldwide and Philippines.

After winning, she got a courtesy call from the mayor of her hometown Cebu City specifically in Liloan. She received a token of appreciation. She also had a homecoming on her mother's hometown Jimenez, Misamis Occidental, Mindanao. This is where she was also invited as a judge for the Search for BB. Jimenez 2012. She also answered in a different event the question of why "It's More fun in the Philippines": "To be honest, I've just never been anywhere else in the world where the people are so friendly, warm, and able to just have a laugh and joke about themselves. That's truly a unique experience in the Philippines, I think." She adds that the Filipinos find joy in the simplest things and this is one more reason why it is more fun in the Philippines.

She also entered Top 13 in Binibining Pilipinas 2007. In the question-and-answer portion, she was asked by one of the judges Miss Universe 1994 Philippines' representative Charlene Gonzales: "What is your biggest fear and what have you done to overcome it?" Her response: "My greatest fear is actually having regret. In anyone's life, it doesn't benefit them if they're gonna regret something so what I do to combat that is that I just make sure that everything I do it's because I want to do it. I don't do something with any doubts in my mind. I do it with sureness and I'm very confident in myself and in that way, that's how I combat that. Thank you."

She entered the top 15 on Miss International 2012 continuing the streak of the Philippines now for five years. She had her final speech as: "Peace, love, unity, these 3 words are the Miss International pageant. Having spent the past 3 weeks in Okinawa, I have witnessed the special connection it has with the world. Globalization and multi cultural diversity can exist. We can be uniquely global and globally unique. This is my mission. I want people to appreciate that we not only belong to local communities but world at large. By this understanding we can contribute to global goals. I am standing here in front of you open to offer my heritage and myself, as a strong compassionate responsible and independent woman in this quest for global harmony. And I can stand here proudly and consider myself an international citizen".

She has been doing modelling internationally on the side for 7 years now. She described herself as a "pretty laid-back and easy-going, although she is not into nudity or sleazy pictures. Sophisticated sexy and edgy attitude is what she's into. She believes with this mixture gives me unique look, something that can be played upon and developed in pictures." Nicole is currently studying Law/Psychology at Macquarie University in Sydney, Australia and is expected to graduate with honors.

Credentials

Television
Hayop sa Galing (TV5 - 2012) - Guest
Minute to Win It (ABS-CBN - 2012) - Guest
The Buzz (ABS-CBN - 2012) - Guest
Kris TV (ABS-CBN - 2012) - Guest
Rated Korina (DZMM - 2012) - Guest

Competitions
MISS INTERNATIONAL 2012 - TOP 15
BINIBINING PILIPINAS - (BINIBINING PILIPINAS INTERNATIONAL 2012
Best In Swimsuit
Best in National Costume
MISS PHILIPPINES-AUSTRALIA - WINNER 2008
Best in Long Gown
Best in Swimsuit
Best in National Costume
Miss Photogenic
MODEL QUEST AUSTRALIA - WINNER 2007
Best in Ramp
Best in Street wear
Best in Swimsuit
Best in Evening Gown
BINIBINING PILIPINAS (MISS PHILIPPINES) - FINALIST 2007
MISS MANDAUE PHILIPPINES - WINNER 2006
Best in National Costume
Best in Evening Gown
MISS TEEN PHILIPPINES - 1ST RUNNER-UP 2006

Ramp Experience
 Jag Fashion Show - 2012
 Philippine Airlines Fashion Show - 2012
 Paddington Fashion Parade - Mackenzie
 Fashion for a Cause - Mackenzie, Amy Lea Taylor
 Various Ramp Shows including brands such as LEE, BENSON, [etc. - 2006-2008
 CUMBIA COLUMBIAN Clothing - Manila 2007
 BENCH FEVER Fashion Show - Manila Fashion Week 2006
 Nokia Fashion Showcase - 2006
 RUDY PROJECT Eyewear Fashion Show - 2006
 Sydney South-Western BRIDAL EXPO - 2005

Print Experience
 Araneta Center - 2012
 Desire Autumn Catelogue
 Boat Charter Business Website Print Material - 2009
 Face of G.O.D CLOTHING Australia - 2008
 Face of SAWO SAUNAS Finland - 2007
 DICKIES Catalogue Model Philippines - 2006
 LEE Catalogue Model Philippines - 2006
 Oz Racing Face of DUCATI Motorcycles Philippines - 2006

TV/Hosting/Presenting Experience
 Channel 7 Morning Show - Bikini Model Summer Fashion
 NRL Dragons TV Presenter 2009
 CEBU CHILDREN'S MODELLING WORKSHOP - Philippines 2007

Judge
 BB. JIMENEZ Philippines - 2012
 COVERGIRL MODEL COMPETITION Australia - 2007 - 2009
 MISS MANDAUE Philippines - 2007

See also
Philippines at major beauty pageants
Binibining Pilipinas
Binibining Pilipinas 2007
Binibining Pilipinas 2012
Miss International 2012

Notes

References

External links

1988 births
Filipino people of German descent
Living people
Miss International 2012 delegates
Star Magic
Binibining Pilipinas winners
Cebuano beauty pageant winners
People from Sydney
People from Cebu City